Ziaabad District is a district (bakhsh) in Takestan County, Qazvin Province, Iran. At the 2006 census, its population was 21,149, in 5,814 families.  The District has one city: Ziaabad. The District has two rural districts (dehestan): Dodangeh-ye Olya Rural District and Dodangeh-ye Sofla Rural District.

References 

Districts of Qazvin Province
Takestan County